Arasanj may refer to:

Arasanj-e Jadid
Arasanj-e Qadim